Himbeergeist (lit "raspberry spirit", also known as raspberry spirit obtained by maceration and distillation, eau de vie de framboise or simply framboise) is a geist (type of fruit brandy or Schnapps) made from raspberries. It is produced mainly in Germany and the Alsace region of France. 

Rather than being distilled into liquor from a fermented mash of fresh fruit like a fruit brandy (Obstler in German), Himbeergeist is made as an infusion. Because raspberries' low sugar content can produce only a limited amount of alcohol, Himbeergeist is created by macerating fresh berries in 95.6% pure neutral spirits. The mixture is then steeped for several weeks to draw out the raspberry essence, distilled, diluted with purified water, and bottled at 40% ABV or stronger.

See also
Brandy

References

Fruit brandies
Distilled drinks